Eric Komeng is a Papua New Guinean footballer who currently plays as a midfielder for PRK Hekari United.

References

Living people
1984 births
Papua New Guinean footballers
Papua New Guinea international footballers
Association football midfielders
People from the National Capital District (Papua New Guinea)
2012 OFC Nations Cup players